Ségbana is a town, arrondissement and commune located in the Alibori Department of Benin. The commune covers an area of 4471 square kilometres and as of 2013 had a population of 89,268 people.

Geography
The commune of Ségbana is located 722 kilometres from Cotonou and lies on the Niger River. Communally it is bounded to the north by Malanville, south by Kalalé, west by Kandi and Gogounou and east by Nigeria.

History 
With the Séro Kpéra camp in Parakou, the civil prison of Ségbana was, during the 1980s under the regime of President Mathieu Kérékou, a prison establishment specially assigned to the detention of political prisoners, sometimes presented as a place of torture, but this point is not confirmed by the filmed testimonies of former prisoners. According to them, the tortures were rather practiced in the Parakou camp.

Administrative divisions
Ségbana is subdivided into 5 arrondissements; Ségbana,  Libantè, Liboussou, Lougou and Sokotindji. They contain 25 villages and 5 urban districts.

Economy
Most of the population are engaged in agricultural activities followed by trade, transportation and handicrafts. The main crops grown are maize, cotton, sorghum, and yams.

References

Arrondissements of Benin
Communes of Benin
Populated places in the Alibori Department